Logan Mailloux (born April 15, 2003) is a Canadian ice hockey defenceman for the London Knights of the Ontario Hockey League (OHL) as a prospect to the Montreal Canadiens of the National Hockey League (NHL). Mailloux was drafted 31st overall by the Canadiens in the 2021 NHL Entry Draft.

Playing career
In the 2019–20 season Logan Mailloux played primarily for the London Knights Junior B affiliate, the London Nationals scoring 18 goals and 50 assists in a 48-game Covid-19 shortened season. This was enough to secure rookie of the year honors as well as defensive player of the year honors in the Greater Ontario Junior Hockey League.

In 2020 Logan Mailloux played 4 games for London Knights, but did not score any points. 

In the 2020–21 season he played as a loan player for SK Lejon in the Swedish Hockeyettan. He had 15 points in 19 games. While in Sweden, Mailloux received a 14,300 Swedish krona fine (approximately $1,640.00 USD or $2,000.00 CAD, at the time) for secretly taking photos of a young woman while they were engaged in a sexual act. He then shared the images, and the identity of the woman, with members of his hockey team.
 

Prior to the 2021 NHL Entry Draft, Mailloux renounced himself from the draft, stating that he did not want to be drafted, and wanted to focus on his reconciliation and growth; despite this, the Montreal Canadiens selected Mailloux with their first-round selection, 31st overall.

Canadian Prime Minister Justin Trudeau, a lifelong Canadiens fan, announced that he was "deeply disappointed" by their decision to select Mailloux, and stated that the selection demonstrated a lack of judgment on the part of the Canadiens. Isabelle Charest, Quebec's Minister for the Status of Women, expressed that she was also surprised and disappointed by the pick. On July 28, the Canadiens announced that Mailloux would not be invited to participate in the team's rookie or main training camp, and that they would "reassess" whether or not he was ready to join the organization later in the year.

On September 2, 2021 the Ontario Hockey League announced that Mailloux had been suspended due to the incident in Sweden. He was reinstated by the OHL on January 1, 2022.

Prior to the commencement of the 2022–23 season, Mailloux was signed by the Canadiens to a three-year, entry-level contract on October 5, 2022.

Career statistics

References

External links
 

2003 births
Living people
Canadian ice hockey players
Ice hockey people from Ontario
London Knights players
Montreal Canadiens draft picks
National Hockey League first-round draft picks
Sportspeople from Windsor, Ontario